The 1989 Taufiqiah Al-Khairiah madrasa fire, which occurred on 22 September 1989, was a fire that took place at Taufiqiah Al-Khairiah madrasa (also known as Madrasah Pondok Pak Ya) in Guar Chempedak, Kedah, Malaysia. Around 27 students, mostly girls, were killed in the incident. All bodies of the victimes were later buried in a special Muslim cemetery at Padang Lumat, they were named as the "27 Syuhada Peristiwa Kebakaran Pondok Pak Ya" (27 Martyrs of the Taufiqiah Al-Khairiah madrasa fire).

Victims 
A total of 27 victims, all women, were killed in the fire.

See also 
 2017 Darul Quran Ittifaqiyah madrasa fire

References

Further reading 
 

Taufiqiah Al-Khairiah madrasa fire
Taufiqiah Al-Khairiah madrasa fire
Taufiqiah Al-Khairiah madrasa fire
Taufiqiah Al-Khairiah madrasa fire
Yan District
Taufiqiah Al-Khairiah madrasa fire